The 2001 West Virginia Mountaineers football team represented West Virginia University in the 2001 NCAA Division I-A football season.   Under new head coach Rich Rodriguez the Mountaineers football suffered their worst season since 1978, finishing with a mark of 3–8.  The season's lowest point was a home loss to Temple, the school's first loss to the Owls since 1984 and first home loss to the school since 1979.

Schedule

References

West Virginia
West Virginia Mountaineers football seasons
West Virginia Mountaineers football